San Silvestre de Guzmán is a municipality of Huelva.

References

Municipalities in the Province of Huelva